The Battle of the River Dee was a battle fought on 29 June 1308 during the Scottish Wars of Independence near Buittle, on the banks of the River Dee, Galloway, Scotland.

Sir Edward de Brus having been left in command in Galloway, Edward led a campaign in Galloway and Douglasdale. Edward had defeated John St John during the Battle of Kirroughtree. He then turned his attention to the stronghold of Buittle Castle and the Balliol lands.

On 29 June 1308, the forces of Edward met a force commanded by Dungal MacDouall of Galloway and Sir Ingram de Umfraville and Sir Aymer de St John, on the banks of the River Dee at a ford on the River. The forces of MacDouall were routed with heavy losses. A Galwegian leader Roland died during the battle.

References
Barbour, John, The Bruce, trans. A. A. H. Douglas, 1964.
Sir Herbert Maxwell, The Chronicle of Lanercost, 1272-1346: translated with notes (1913).

Battles of the Wars of Scottish Independence
History of Dumfries and Galloway
1308 in Scotland
Conflicts in 1308
Battles between England and Scotland